Luiz Fernando da Silva Monte (born 14 April 1991 in Camaragibe), commonly known as Fernando Karanga, is a Brazilian footballer who plays as a forward for Henan Jianye.

Career

Early career
Karanga began his professional career with Santa Cruz, but failed to cement a first team place and spent loan spells with Bragantino and Belo Jardim before joining Trindade on a permanent basis.

CSKA Sofia
Karanga signed a two-and-a-half-year deal with CSKA Sofia on 2 February 2017. On 29 April he scored a goal in the Eternal derby of Bulgarian football, netting the third in CSKA's 3–0 win over Levski Sofia.

Karanga began the 2017–18 season with a goal in the first league game against Slavia Sofia on 15 July, which ended in a 1–1 draw. Two weeks later he scored his first hat-trick in Bulgaria during a 6–2 away win over Botev Plovdiv. Karanga continued his scoring run in the following games, scoring 12 goals in his first 11 league matches of the campaign. He also scored on his Bulgarian Cup debut against Botev Vratsa in the 1/8 finals. The Brazilian finished the year with a total of 23 goals in 30 league games for the Reds, in addition to 2 games and 1 goal in the Bulgarian Cup. He continued his fine performances during the first months of 2018, but sustained an injury in the second leg of a Bulgarian Cup match against Levski Sofia on 25 April (after a rough tackle), which sidelined him until the end of the season and was a factor in him finishing in second place for the top goalscorer award in the league.

Karanga is the highest scoring foreign player (alongside Tiago Rodrigues) in the league fixtures of The Eternal Derby with three goals under his belt. He quickly emerged as a favourite with the CSKA Sofia fans.

Henan Jianye
On 12 July 2018, Karanga was transferred to Chinese Super League side Henan Jianye for a reported transfer fee of $4 million. He suffered from serious splenic injury in October after a match against Beijing Guoan, and received splenectomy. He discharged from hospital in November, and returned to Brazil for further treatments and recoveries.

In March 2019, he was loaned to Nacional. In July 2019, he recovered from previous incident, and rejoined Henan Jianye.

Career statistics 

.

Honours

Club
Santa Cruz
Campeonato Pernambucano: 2011

Individual

Best forward in the Bulgarian First League: 2017
Best foreign player in the Bulgarian First League: 2017

References

External links
 
 
 

1991 births
Living people
Brazilian footballers
Brazilian expatriate footballers
Campeonato Brasileiro Série B players
Santa Cruz Futebol Clube players
Boa Esporte Clube players
Jeju United FC players
K League 1 players
Criciúma Esporte Clube players
PFC CSKA Sofia players
Henan Songshan Longmen F.C. players
Nacional Atlético Clube (SP) players
Chinese Super League players
First Professional Football League (Bulgaria) players
Brazilian expatriate sportspeople in South Korea
Expatriate footballers in South Korea
Brazilian expatriate sportspeople in Bulgaria
Expatriate footballers in Bulgaria
Expatriate footballers in China
Brazilian expatriate sportspeople in China
Association football forwards